The Boy's pommel horse event final for the 2014 Summer Youth Olympics took place on the 23rd of August at Nanjing Olympic Sports Center Gymnasium.

Medalists

Qualification

The top eight gymnasts from qualification advanced into the final – with exception to Marios Georgiou, who placed eighth during qualifications. He suffered a finger injury and withdrew from the competition.

Results

Reserves

The following gymnasts were reserves for the final:

References

Gymnastics at the 2014 Summer Youth Olympics